Ansche Chesed is a synagogue on the Upper West Side of the New York City borough of Manhattan.

History

The congregation was founded in 1828 by a group of German, Dutch, and Polish Jews who split off from Congregation B'nai Jeshurun. Before 1850, the congregation met at various locations, including 32 and 38 Henry Street. By 1850, when the congregation erected the building on Norfolk Street, on Manhattan's Lower East Side, that is now the Angel Orensanz Center, there had been further secessions, and the congregation was composed of immigrants from Germany. It was also the largest in the United States. In 1874, the congregation merged with Congregation Adas Jeshurun of 221 West 39th Street to form Congregation Beth-El. This group met at a newly-constructed synagogue in Yorkville, on the corner of Lexington Avenue and 63rd Street, but circa 1877 the more traditional German Jews of the congregation reconstituted Ansche Chesed near Lexington Avenue and 113th Street. They were joined by newer immigrants. A small building they used, at 160 East 112th Street, was used by another synagogue, Congregation Tikvath Israel, until at least the mid-1970s, and in 2019 is the Christ Apostolic Church of U.S.A.

In 1908, the congregation was part of the movement of upper-middle-class New Yorkers to the newly fashionable neighborhood of Harlem. They moved from the 112th Street location to a handsome Greek revival Temple at Seventh Avenue and 114th Street. It cost the congregation $200,000 to erect the building in 1908 and 1909. Edward Shire designed the building using limestone and brick. It had seating for 1,200 worshippers, classrooms for 400, and a glass-walled garden on the roof.

In 1928, the congregation again followed fashion, from Harlem to the even newer Upper West Side of Manhattan, opening its present Byzantine revival building at West End Avenue and 100th Street. The architect was again Edward I. Shire,  and the cost was $1.3 million. The previous location was sold to the Catholic Archdiocese of New York, who opened the Iglesia de Nuestra Señora de la Milagrosa church to serve Harlem's Hispanic demographic. In 1980, the Archdiocese sold it to Mt. Neboh Baptist Church, which still occupies it . The cornerstone showing the Hebrew year 5668, and the carved luchos at the top of the building, show its Ansche Chesed heritage. 

The West End building was designed to seat 1,600, have social events for 500, and like its predecessor, has a rooftop garden.

Clergy and presidents

Rabbis 
 Max Lilienthal (1815-1882) honorary rabbi from 1852 to 1857
 J. Bondi 1859-1860
 J. Mielziner 1868
J. Kohn 1911-1931

...
 Michael Strassfeld .-2001
 Jeremy Kalmanofsky 2001-Present

Hazzanim (cantors) 
 Jonas Hecht (1805-1898) held the position c. 1845-1852 and again in 1859; one of the 12 original founders of the B'nai B'rith organization
 L. Sternberger 1851 to 1859
 A. Sternberg 1861 to 1867
 ? Figel 1867
...
 Natasha Hirschhorn 2004- Present

Parnasim (presidents) 
 Michael Schwab (d. 1898) 1862-1868; one of the 12 original founders of the B'nai B'rith organization
 S. Schuster 1868
 S. Hermann 1872
...
 Martin Sinkoff 2015
 Mark Paul 2018

Contemporary

Ansche Chesed is an egalitarian, participatory Conservative synagogue.  In addition to its historic sanctuary, the congregation has a multi-story building with many classrooms and several event spaces.  This makes it possible for multiple activities to take place in the building throughout the week, as well as for several minyanim to meet within the congregation.  The minyanim include:
 Sanctuary Service
 Minyan Ma'at
 Minyan Rimonim
 West Side Minyan

Ansche Chesed's Sanctuary Service is the minyan that directly continues the historical congregation of Ansche Chesed; its name derives from the fact that it holds its services in the synagogue's sanctuary. This service follows the traditional Conservative liturgy (including full Torah reading and Haftarah and Musaf service). Rabbi Jeremy Kalmanofsky  delivers Divrei Torah (comments and explanations on the weekly Torah portion) several times a month and offers weekly comments on various aspects of the service. Cantor Natasha J. Hirschhorn  leads the sung portion of the service, and is also Ansche Chesed's music director. Lay members of the congregation also participate actively in all facets of the service.

Ansche Chesed runs a Hebrew School, with classes that begin in pre-school and continue through the teen years.  The synagogue also runs an array of other educational initiatives, focused on adult learning, literature, and family programs.  A Social Action Committee oversees a series of community outreach and support programs, including the hosting of a homeless shelter, local park clean-up activities, and programs focused on topics such as the environment.  Ansche Chesed hosts several unaffiliated nursery schools, including Purple Circle, Morningside Montessori, Yaldaynu Preschool, and Discovery Programs.

Ansche Chesed also houses The Havurah School, serving students from kindergarten through 7th grade. It is an independent, self-supporting school that has been at Ansche Chesed for over 20 years.  At the Havurah School, students learn a wide variety of Jewish subjects primarily through the arts.  Biblical improvisation, painting and drawing, work in clay, movement, creative writing, debate and music are some of the techniques used to experientially understand the Torah, the holidays, and the great themes of Jewish life, tradition, and philosophy.

References

External links

Google Maps view of the 114th Street location, showing luchos and cornerstone

Dutch-American culture in New York City
Dutch-Jewish culture in the United States
German-Jewish culture in New York City
Polish-Jewish culture in New York City
Synagogues in Manhattan
West End Avenue
Upper West Side
Byzantine Revival architecture in New York City
Byzantine Revival synagogues
Unaffiliated synagogues in New York City
1828 establishments in New York (state)
Conservative synagogues in New York City